Delta Kappa Gamma is a professional society for women educators.

History
The society was founded on May 11, 1929, at the Faculty Women’s Club at the University of Texas, Austin, Texas. The idea was conceived by Annie Webb Blanton, member of the faculty of the University of Texas and a former state superintendent of public instruction in Texas. Eleven women educators from Texas were initiated: Mamie Sue Bastian, Houston, Texas; Ruby Cole, San Antonio, Texas; Mabel Grizzard, Waxahachie, Texas; Anna Hiss, Austin, Texas; Ray King, Fort Worth, Texas; Sue King, Fort Worth, Texas; Helen Koch, Austin, Texas; Ruby Terrill Lomax, Austin, Texas; Cora M. Martin, Austin, Texas; Lalla M. Odom, Austin, Texas; Lela Lee Williams, Dallas, Texas.

Organizational structure
The  society is structured in three levels: local chapters, state, and international organizations.  Its Constitution and Standing Rules govern activities at all levels.
Member countries  are the United States, Canada, Norway, Sweden, Mexico, Finland, Guatemala, Iceland, The Netherlands, Puerto Rico, Great Britain, El Salvador, Costa Rica, Germany, Estonia, Panama, and Japan.

Symbolism and traditions
The red rose logo was developed in a recent rebranding effort.

The colors of the Society are Red and Green.

Notable members
 Annie Moore Cherry
 C. Louise Boehringer
 Sue Ramsey Johnston Ferguson
Barbara Howard

See also

 Professional fraternities and sororities

References

Education-related professional associations